JSC Tomskneft VNK — is a Russian oil and gas company, headquartered in Strezhevoy, Russia. Founded in 1966, Tomskneft is one of the largest companies of the Tomsk region and Siberia. As of 2022, the Independent Oil Company and Gazpromneft own 50% of the company respectively.

History

Tomskneft is the successor company to a Soviet plant that was founded in January 1966 by the decree of the Tyumen oil and gas industrial enterprise. The plant extracted the first million tons of oil in 1969. By 1974, it produced 25 million tons of oil. In 1977, the Ministry of Oil Industry separated Tomskneft from the Tyumen oil and gas industrial enterprise, thus forming the Tomskneft industrial association.

Following the dissolution of the Soviet Union, Tomskneft was privatized in 1993.

In 1997, Yukos, one of the largest Russian oil producers at the time, acquired the majority interest of the EOC, thus taking over Tomskneft and the EOC's other subsidiaries. Tomskneft was a part of Yukos until 2007, when its shares were sold to Rosneft and Gazpromneft due to the parent company's bankruptcy. Each company acquired 50% of Tomskneft's stocks.

In August 2021, Rosneft sold its block of Tomskneft's shares to the Independent Oil Company.

Activity
Tomskneft operates in the oil and gas industry, mainly focusing on exploration and extraction of the sources. As of 2020, the company owned 32 oil and gas fields, extracting annually up to 5,2 million of tons of oil.

Controversies
In December 1998, Asirota Limited, a Cypriot company, holding 13% of Tomskneft's shares, accused Yukos of violating the rights of minority shareholders by lowering Tomskneft's oil prices. This case was later used in a trial against Mikhail Khodorkovsky, Yukos's former owner. He was allegedly accused of stealing 350 million tons of oil from Tomskneft and other Yukos's subsidiaries. Russian economist Sergei Guriev later regarded the trial and subsequent incarceration of Khodorkovsky as a political repression.

In 2015, Tomskneft was fined for illegal use of an oil exploration and extraction sites in the Kargasoksky District. Upon paying the fine, the company was granted permission to exploit the industrial sites.

In 2019, Tomskneft and the PetroAlians Oil Company signed an agreement to extract petroleum at the Lomovoye oil field in the Tomsk region. In May 2020, due to an accident, Tomskneft's workers left PetroAlians's equipment in the oil well. In April 2022, the court ruled that Tomskneft had to pay 30,7 million rubles to its partner for the lost equipment. Although Tomskneft appealed the suit in June 2022, the court of appeal confirmed that the company should pay the established sum to PetroAlians. In December the same year, the arbitration court of the Tomsk oblast has ruled that the "Samotlorneftepromkhim" (SNPK) drilling company should pay 30,7 million rubles to Tomskneft to reimburse the loss of PetroAlians's equipment at Lomovoye oil field.

References

Literature
 

 

 

Oil companies of Russia
Natural gas companies of Russia
Oil and gas companies of Russia
Yukos
Rosneft
Companies based in Tomsk Oblast
1977 establishments in Russia